Materials management is a core supply chain function and includes supply chain planning and supply chain execution capabilities. Specifically, materials management is the capability firms use to plan total material requirements.  The material requirements are communicated to procurement and other functions for sourcing.  Materials management is also responsible for determining the amount of material to be deployed at each stocking location across the supply chain, establishing material replenishment plans, determining inventory levels to hold for each type of inventory (raw material, WIP, finished goods), and communicating information regarding material needs throughout the extended supply chain.

Typical roles in Materials Management include: Materials Manager, Inventory Control Manager, Inventory Analyst, Material Planner, Expediter and emerging hybrid roles like "buyer planner".

The primary business objective of Materials Management is assured supply of material, optimum inventory levels and minimum deviation between planned and actual results.

Supply chain materials management areas of concentration

Goals
The goal of materials management is to provide an unbroken chain of components for production to manufacture goods on time for customers. The materials department is charged with releasing materials to a supply base, ensuring that the materials are delivered on time to the company using the correct carrier. Materials is generally measured by accomplishing on time delivery to the customer, on time delivery from the supply base, attaining a freight, budget, inventory shrink management, and inventory accuracy. The materials department is also charged with the responsibility of managing new launches.

In some companies materials management is also charged with the procurement of materials by establishing and managing a supply base. In other companies the procurement and management of the supply base is the responsibility of a separate purchasing department. The purchasing department is then responsible for the purchased price variances from the supply base.

In large companies with multitudes of customer changes to the final product there may be a separate logistics department that is responsible for all new acquisition launches and customer changes. This logistics department ensures that the launch materials are procured for production and then transfers the responsibility to the plant materials management

Materials management
The major challenge that materials managers face is maintaining a consistent flow of materials for production. There are many factors that inhibit the accuracy of inventory which results in production shortages, premium freight, and often inventory adjustments. 
The major issues that all materials managers face are incorrect bills of materials, inaccurate cycle counts, un-reported scrap, shipping errors, receiving errors, and production reporting errors. Materials managers have striven to determine how to manage these issues in the business sectors of manufacturing since the beginning of the industrial revolution.

Materials management in construction 
Materials typically account for a large portion of a construction project's budget. Some sources suggest, that materials may account for more than 70% of a construction project's cost. Despite these statistics, when project budgets and efficiency are considered, labour and cost reduction are discussed. Materials management often get's overlooked, even though successful projects are a result of a successful blend of labour, materials and equipment management.  When materials are tracked efficiently project time can be optimized, costs can be saved and quality can be maximized.

There is a lack of efficient materials management in capital and investment construction projects, because each project is typically viewed as an individual effort, with each project needing a unique plan. The geographical location and technology needed for different projects will present distinctive challenges, but in general all projects will have elements that can be predicted from previous construction projects.

Types of construction projects and how this effects materials management 
Typically, the more technically challenging a project is, the more difficult materials management becomes; However, the need for transparent materials tracking is highlighted in these types of projects.

Residential construction projects- Residential projects can be homes or apartment buildings, that are intended for living. Managing material flows in these projects is usually easier, because typically engineering and construction teams as well as budgets are smaller, in comparison to projects listed later in this article.  Also, technical specifications of projects don't vary as much as for example in heavy-industry construction projects.

Commercial construction projects- These types of projects include retail stores, your restaurants and hotels. The complexity of the project and the needs for thorough material tracking will typically depend on the size of the project.

Specialized industrial construction projects- These projects are large-scale and technically complex. Examples of these types of projects include nuclear power plants, chemical processing plants, steel mills, pulp mills and oil refineries. The materials procured for these projects require specific engineering knowledge (i.e. piping, valves, motors, industrial tanks, fans, boilers, control valves etc.). The importance of material tracking in these types of projects is extremely high, because the project network is large, materials are procured from all over the world and the construction sites are typically in remote locations with poor infrastructure.

Industrial construction projects- Examples of industrial construction projects include warehouses and manufacturing facilities. These types of projects tend to be slightly more complex than residential or commercial construction projects and they require more technical knowledge. This increases the need for efficient materials management.

Materials management in capital-heavy construction projects 
Materials management is the process of planning and controlling material flows. It includes planning and procuring materials, supplier evaluation and selection, purchasing, expenditure, shipping, receipt processes for materials (including quality control), warehousing and inventory, and materials distribution. After the construction project finishes, maintenance of materials can also be looked as a part of materials management.

Material management processes and functions in large-scale capital projects encompass multiple organizations and integrated processes. Capital project supply networks typically include project owners, main contractors, EPC/M contractors, material suppliers, logistics partners and project site contractors.

Digital tools for materials management in construction 
It is very common to use digital tools for materials management in capital projects. Materials requirement planning systems and procurement systems are well-liked in the industry. Minimizing procurement costs through comparing bids is an essential part of reducing projects costs. Computer-based systems are an excellent tool during the purchasing process, because equipment specification, supplier selection, delivery time guarantees, shipping fees and multiple other aspects of procurements can be automatically compared on one platform.

Material deliveries from the supplier to the construction site can be tracked using various tools.  For example, project freight forwards will typically have precise information on containers and deliveries sent to the construction site, but typically their systems lack insight into the specific materials and components within those deliveries. Details on packing lists will be attached to the packages in the delivery and they will typically be sent to the purchaser via email. Other ways of tracking deliveries include RFID-tagging packages or components. The downfall with this method is that suppliers or purchasers have to invest in RFID-tags. Common materials data-bases for the project network can also be implemented to share data on material deliveries.

Once the materials arrive at the construction site, receipt processes for the goods should be followed. The storage locations should be recorded, so that individual components are easy to locate as construction sites. Inventory of the goods should also be monitored (when goods are taken for assembly). Storing procured materials appropriately is crucial for saving costs. For example, if electronical equipment is procured and delivered to the construction site in one lot to save costs on multiple delivery fees, the electrical equipment that is not needed for assembly immediately has to be stored in water-proof locations. Digital tools can be used to plan for incoming deliveries and how to store them. The need for digital tools is furthermore highlighted, if materials are stored for example in contractor warehouses rather than the construction site. This way all project parties will know, where goods can be located.

See also

 Supply chain management
 Document automation
 Enterprise resource planning (ERP) 
 Warehouse management system
 Storage management system
 Automated identification and data capture
 Cash conversion cycle
 Consignment stock
 Cost of goods sold 
 Economic order quantity
 Economic lot scheduling problem
 Material requirements planning 
 Newsvendor model
 Vendor-managed inventory
 Scan-based trading
 ABC analysis
 FSN analysis
 SWOT analysis
 Inventory investment
 Inventory management software
 Logistics
 Operations research
 Pinch point (economics)
 Project production management
 Service level
 Spare part
 Stock management

References

Further reading
 
  
 
 
 
 
 
 
 
 
 
  
 
 
 Jaiswal, N. K. “Materials Management.” Economic and Political Weekly, vol. 6, no. 48, Economic and Political Weekly, 1971, pp. M137–M137,  
 Wilson, James W. Transportation Journal, vol. 1, no. 4, Penn State University Press, 1962, pp. 39–40,  
 Reid, Dan. “Purchasing and Materials Management Textbooks.” The Academy of Management Review, vol. 11, no. 4, Academy of Management, 1986, pp. 878–83,  
  
 
 Chertow, Marian, Matthew Gordon, and INGRID C. BURKE. “Waste and Materials Management: FROM HARM REDUCTION TO VALUE CREATION.” In A Better Planet: Forty Big Ideas for a Sustainable Future, edited by DANIEL C. ESTY, 250–57. Yale University Press, 2019. . 
 GUTH, CHRISTINE M. E. “Craft Organizations and Operations.” Craft Culture in Early Modern Japan: Materials, Makers, and Mastery, 1st ed., University of California Press, 2021, pp. 109–38, .
 Patrahau, Irina, Ankita Singhvi, Michel Rademaker, Hugo van Manen, René Kleijn, and Lucia van Geuns. “Strategies to Secure Supply.” Securing Critical Materials for Critical Sectors: Policy Options for the Netherlands and the European Union. Hague Centre for Strategic Studies, 2020. .
 Tomaszewska J. Polish Transition towards Circular Economy: Materials Management and Implications for the Construction Sector. Materials (Basel). 2020 Nov 19;13(22):5228. . ; .
 Young, Scott T. "Hospitals materials management: systems and performance." Journal of Purchasing & Materials Management, Fall 1989, 31+. Gale Academic OneFile (accessed February 20, 2022). .
 "Materials Management - Evolving the Process for an Evolving Marketplace." Chemical Engineering, March 1, 2016. Gale Academic OneFile (accessed February 20, 2022). . 
  
 Wilkinson, Edward S., Jr. "An overview of certification programs in the purchasing and materials management field." International Journal of Purchasing and Materials Management, Winter 1992, 34+. Gale Academic OneFile (accessed February 20, 2022). .
 Tomlin, Natalia, and Irina Kandarasheva. "Ready or not? An assessment of shelf-ready materials management practices in US academic libraries." Library Resources & Technical Services, July 2014, 153+. Gale Academic OneFile (accessed February 20, 2022). .
 Handfield, Robert B. "The role of materials management in developing time-based competition." International Journal of Purchasing and Materials Management, Winter 1993, 2+. Gale Academic OneFile (accessed February 20, 2022). . 
 Lefteroff, Lewis. "Efficient materials management: design and operations advice for productive supply activity." Health Facilities Management 30, no. 3 (2017): 35+. Gale Academic OneFile (accessed February 20, 2022). .
 Weitz, K.A. (2012). Life Cycle Assessment and End of Life Materials Management. In Life Cycle Assessment Handbook, M.A. Curran (Ed.). . 
 Zenz, G.J. (1975), Evaluating Materials Management. Journal of Purchasing and Materials Management, 11: 15-18. .
 Browning, J.M. (1988), Curriculum Development in Purchasing and Materials Management. Journal of Purchasing and Materials Management, 24: 22-28. .
 Rider, G.W. (1973), Logistics and Materials Management. Journal of Purchasing, 9: 64-72. . 
 Joshi, K. (1990), Materials Management Policies and Warehouse Requirements: A Case Study. Journal of Purchasing and Materials Management, 26: 27-31. .  
 Hinrichs S, Jahagirdar D, Miani C, Guerin B, Nolte E. Learning for the NHS on procurement and supply chain management: a rapid evidence assessment. Southampton (UK): NIHR Journals Library; 2014 Dec. .
 Baran, Malgorzata. "The modeling process of the materials management system in a manufacturing company based on the system dynamics method." Journal of Entrepreneurship, Management and Innovation 9, no. 2 (2013): 79+. Gale Academic OneFile (accessed February 20, 2022). .
 Joshi, Kailash. "Materials management policies and warehouse requirements: a case study." Journal of Purchasing & Materials Management, Spring 1990, 27+. Gale Academic OneFile (accessed February 20, 2022). .
 Febus, Steven, and Karen Peterson. "Checklist for materials management supply contracts." Healthcare Financial Management, July 2009, 90. Gale Academic OneFile (accessed February 20, 2022). . 
  
 
 Forker, Laura b. "Purchasing and Materials Management." International Journal of Purchasing and Materials Management, Summer 1994, 49+. Gale Academic OneFile (accessed February 20, 2022). .
 Spruch, Arthur, and Robert Brendon. "Investing in materials management: how the right materials and campus design approaches can promote sustainability." University Business 12, no. 2 (2009): 18. Gale Academic OneFile (accessed February 20, 2022). .
  
 Carter, Joseph R., and Ram Narasimhan. "The role of purchasing and materials management in total quality management and customer satisfaction." International Journal of Purchasing and Materials Management, Summer 1994, 2+. Gale Academic OneFile (accessed February 20, 2022). .
 Tomaszewska J. Polish Transition towards Circular Economy: Materials Management and Implications for the Construction Sector. Materials (Basel). 2020 Nov 19;13(22):5228. . ; .
 Silva A, Rosano M, Stocker L, Gorissen L. From waste to sustainable materials management: Three case studies of the transition journey. Waste Manag. 2017 Mar;61:547-557. . Epub 2016 Dec 9. .

External links
Indian Institute of Materials Management
Association for Healthcare Resource & Materials Management (AHRMM)
(APICS)
 Inventory Management System

 

 
Business terms  
Distribution (marketing)  
Manufacturing 
Management by type
Enterprise resource planning terminology
Inventory 
Inventory optimization 
Logistics 
Procurement
Production and manufacturing 
Production economics  
Supply chain management
Warehouses